Lachen is a municipality in the district of Unterallgäu in Bavaria, Germany. The town has a municipal association with Memmingerberg.

Notable people 
 Johannes Zick (1702 in Lachen – 1762) a German painter of frescoes in southern Germany, active during the Baroque period
 Oberleutnant Stefan Kirmaier (1889 in Lachen - 1916) a World War I German flying ace

References

Unterallgäu